Wolf Lake is an unincorporated community in Noble Township, Noble County, in the U.S. state of Indiana.

History
Wolf Lake was platted in 1836, taking its name from the nearby eponymous lake. A post office has been in operation at Wolf Lake since 1834.

The former Luckey Hospital was listed on the National Register of Historic Places in 2013.

Education
Wolf Lake High School made their mark on the Indiana basketball map by winning the regional title in 1942. The Wolf Lake Wolves, with an enrollment of 123 students, beat Fort Wayne Central High School, moving on to the semi-state where they lost to Muncie Burris High School. The small school from northeast Indiana is the smallest school from this part of the state to make it to the semi-state round of the state basketball tournament. The Wolves were led by a senior class of Art Keister, Paul Keister, Roger Stangland and Delbert Hartman. Beginning their high school careers in 1939–40, this class led their team to three Noble County championships, 50 straight regular season wins and a 70–5 record over three years.

Festivals
Each August, citizens celebrate their heritage with the Onion Days Festival.

Geography

References

Unincorporated communities in Noble County, Indiana
Unincorporated communities in Indiana